Massimiliano Gatto (born 28 October 1995) is an Italian footballer who currently plays for Italian side Como as a striker.

Club career 
Gatto is a youth exponent from Chievo. On 1 August 2014, he joined Serie B side Carpi on a season-long loan. He made his debut on 27 September 2014 against Virtus Entella in a Serie B game. He came in as an 80th-minute substitute for Filippo Porcari in a 2–0 away defeat.

In 2017–18 season, both Massimiliano Gatto and Emanuele Gatto were remained in Chievo. However, they both left the club in January 2018. Massimiliano was signed by Pro Vercelli; he was assigned number 19 shirt of the first team.

On 17 August 2019, he signed a 3-year contract with Como.

References

1995 births
Living people
Italian footballers
Association football forwards
Italy youth international footballers
A.C. Carpi players
F.C. Pro Vercelli 1892 players
Pisa S.C. players
Como 1907 players
Serie B players
Serie C players
People from Trebisacce
Sportspeople from the Province of Cosenza
Footballers from Calabria